Edwin Henry Palmer (June 1, 1893 – January 9, 1983), known as Eddie Palmer and nicknamed Baldy Palmer, was a Major League Baseball (MLB) third baseman. He played for the Philadelphia Athletics in 1917.

References

External links

1893 births
1983 deaths
Baseball players from Texas
Dallas Giants players
Dallas Marines players
Dallas Submarines players
Denver Bears players
Fort Worth Panthers players
Major League Baseball third basemen
Minor league baseball managers
Monroe Drillers players
Muskogee Mets players
People from Lamar County, Texas
Philadelphia Athletics players
Sioux City Packers players